This is a list of Norwegian football transfers in the winter transfer window 2012–2013 by club. Only clubs of the 2013 Tippeligaen are included.

2013 Tippeligaen

Aalesund

In:

Out:

Brann

In:

Out:

Haugesund

In:

Out:

Hønefoss

In:

Out:

Lillestrøm

In:

Out:

Molde

In:

  
 

 

Out:

Odd

In:

Out:

Rosenborg

In:

Out:

Sandnes Ulf

In:

Out:

Sarpsborg 08

In:

Out:

Sogndal

In:

Out:

Start

In:

Out:

Strømsgodset

In:

Out:

Tromsø

In:

 

Out:

Viking

In:
 

 

Out:

Vålerenga

In:

Out:

References

Norway
Transfers
Transfers
2012–13